Birr (meaning "plain of water") is a town in County Offaly, Ireland. Between 1620 and 1899 it was called Parsonstown, after the Parsons family who were local landowners and hereditary Earls of Rosse.  Birr is a designated Irish Heritage Town with a carefully preserved Georgian heritage. Birr itself has graceful wide streets and elegant buildings. Many of the houses in John's Place and Oxmantown Mall have exquisite fanlight windows of the Georgian period. The town is known for Birr Castle and gardens, home of the Parsons family, and also the site of the Leviathan of Parsonstown, the largest telescope in the world for over 70 years, and a large modern radio telescope.

Access and transport
The town is situated near the meeting of the Camcor and Little Brosna rivers, the latter flowing on into the River Shannon near Victoria Lock.

The Ormond Flying Club has been in operation at Birr Airfield for over 30 years. The area has been linked with aviation for some time – as a British Army airstrip was previously near the current field.

Birr lies on the N52 and N62 national secondary roads. The routes are combined as they pass through Birr. The R439, R440 and R489 regional roads also terminate in the town.

Bus Éireann provide public transport services to the town. The Athlone to Limerick service regularly passes through the town daily. Kearns privately owned bus service provides a number of direct bus services to Dublin from Birr.

Birr railway station, the terminus of a branch from the Limerick–Ballybrophy line at Roscrea, opened on 8 March 1858 and closed on 1 January 1963.

History

Ancient history
A monastery was founded here by St Brendan of Birr. It produced the MacRegol Gospels, named after the abbot at the turn of the 8th/9th century and now to be seen in the Bodleian Library in Oxford. The Synod of Birr, held in 697, was the occasion on which the Cáin Adomnáin, or law of innocents, was pronounced.

In Gaelic Ireland, Birr was located in the O'Carroll territory of Éile. This petty kingdom formed an area that now forms the south of County Offaly and the northeast of County Tipperary. The Tuatha was subject to the overkingdom of Munster and formed a border with the Kingdom of Meath to the east. The boundary between Ely O'Carroll and the ancient Meath is co-terminous with the present boundary between the Diocese of Killaloe and the Diocese of Meath. The O'Carroll family had a castle located at the present site of Birr Castle. Following the Plantations of Ireland, Birr was located in the Barony of Ballybritt following the formation of King's County (now County Offaly) in 1556.

The town itself is an old market and former garrison town dating to the 1620s.

Crotty Schism
The town was also the location of the Crotty Schism, one of the few schisms to affect the Catholic Church in Ireland in the 19th century. The ruins of a church on Castle Street were the result of the Crotty Schism however it is now in a derelict condition after it fell into disuse following the end of the schism. The church is known locally as Crotty's Church. In recent years it has become a hub for social dancing.

Birr Barracks
Birr Barracks became the depot of the Prince of Wales's Leinster Regiment (Royal Canadians) from 1881. The barracks at Birr was burned down in 1922 during the Irish Civil War and the outer perimeter wall is all that remains.

Annalistic references
See Annals of Inisfallen.
 AI664.1 Kl. Death of Cúcen Máthair, and of Diarmait, son of Aed Slaine. [AU 665]. Fighting in Birra.
 AI822.1 Kl. Mac Riaguil, abbot of Birra, rested.

Features

Georgian Birr 

Birr is a designated Irish Heritage Town due to the preservation and wealth of Georgian architecture in the town. The earliest Georgian-style buildings dating from the 1740s are located in Emmet Square and Emmet Street (then known as Cumberland Square and Cumberland Street). The column in the centre of the square dates from 1747 and was built to carry the statue of the Duke of Cumberland, known as the Bloody Duke and the victor of the Battle of Culloden. The statue was removed in 1915 as it was in danger of collapse. The Oxmantown Mall was laid out in the early 19th century and was designed as a promenade leading from Birr Castle gates to the Church of Ireland. The mall is tree lined on one side with the Georgian houses on the other. John's Mall was also built during this time also with fine Georgian buildings. The area is also known as the chains due to the sturdy chain railings enclosing the central plots in the centre of the Mall. Birr Town Council meets here in a building known as John's Hall built in the style of a Greek Temple.

The Seffin Stone is said to mark the centre of Ireland. Mentioned by Geraldus Cambrensis, who referred to it as Umbilicus Hiberniae, the indentations on the stone are as old as megalithic sites, such as Newgrange. Myths claim that the indentations are from the hand of Finn MacCool, hence the origin of the name as Suigh Finn (pronounced "See-Finn"), the Seat of Finn. It is located to the left of the gates to St John's Hall, on John's Mall, close to Emmet Square.

In Emmet Square stands Dooly's Hotel: one of the oldest coaching inns in Ireland, dating from 1747. The name of Galway Blazers was given to the Galway Hunt after a celebration held in the hotel in 1809 resulted in the premises being set on fire. Film director John Huston was latterly a member of the Galway Blazers. Australian soprano Dame Nellie Melba famously sang to crowds gathered below in the Square, from her hotel room above in Dooly's Hotel. The nightclub attached to the hotel is named "Melba's" to mark the occasion.

Ecclesiastical architecture
On the Wilmer road, near the County Arms Hotel, is a Gothic-style Catholic church built. St. Brendan's Church of Ireland was also built in Gothic style in 1815 and is located in the Oxmantown Mall. A smaller Methodist Church known as Wesley Chapel was built in 1820 on Emmett Street to accommodate a growing Methodist congregation following the preaching of John Wesley in the late 18th century in Birr.

The Sisters of Mercy convent on Wilmer Road beside the Catholic church is also a gothic-styled building. Most of the convent was converted by Offaly County Council to civic offices and a public library.

Birr Castle

Birr Castle is the oldest inhabited home in the county. In the 16th century, the O'Carrolls of Éile had one of their castles here and this was granted to the English-born politician and judge Sir Lawrence Parsons in the course of the Stuart plantation, c. 1620. Sir Laurence Parsons built most of the structure of the present castle. The castle was twice besieged in the 17th century and one of the towers still shows the scars of the artillery of Patrick Sarsfield, 1st Earl of Lucan, who tried unsuccessfully to take it. The castle remains the seat of the Earls of Rosse and is home to the current peer, Brendan Parsons, 7th Earl of Rosse, with family members resident in the demesne. As a family home, most of the castle is only open to the public on special occasions, though three rooms can be visited more routinely through the demesne's visitor centre. The castle's demesne, however, is open to tourists every day of the year, and the gardens comprise a landscaped park with waterfalls, river and lake, as well as the large reflecting telescope, the Leviathan of Parsonstown, and the modern radio-telescope, I-LOFAR.

Birr Telescope – The 'Leviathan of Parsonstown'

The main feature on the grounds of the castle is the great Leviathan of Parsonstown, an astronomical telescope with a 72-inch metal mirror erected by The 3rd Earl of Rosse, which was, until 1917, the largest telescope in the world. The spiral structure of nebulae was discovered through this telescope. It featured in the PBS (USA) documentary, 'Telescope – Hunting the Edge of Space Part 1: The Mystery of the Milky Way' (2011). Astronomy broadcaster Sir Patrick Moore wrote The Astronomy of Birr Castle (1971), a history of the telescope and the significance of the work carried out here.

Workhouse
The workhouse, located in Syngefield, on Newbridge Street, opened in 1842 before the Great Famine. The building is now mainly derelict. It is not yet open to the public.

Firsts 
On 31 August 1869, the first road fatality recorded in history occurred in Birr, when local-born scientist Mary Ward, a cousin of The 3rd Earl of Rosse, fell from a steam-powered car on a bend. The vehicle traversed her, causing fatal injuries.

A descendant of the O'Carrolls, Charles Carroll was the first and only Catholic to sign the United States Declaration of Independence and, also, the only signatory to give his address. To distinguish himself from his father, Charles Carroll of Annapolis, he signed in full as "Charles Carroll of Carrollton". The first US Senator for Maryland, he is mentioned in the state song and a former home forms part of Johns Hopkins University.

Local government
 
In local government, Birr is a municipal district within Offaly County Council. The district itself covers the entire west & south of Offaly. It was formed following a merger of the Ferbane electoral area and Birr Town Council in 2014. The district returns 6 elected representatives to Offaly County Hall in Tullamore. Prior to 2014, the town had its own urban council, Birr Town Council with its own elected representatives. The council's jurisdiction was only to the Birr urban area. It was formerly known as Birr Urban District Council prior to 2002. Originally council met at John's Hall, a distinctive Greek Temple-style building located in John's Mall. In the mid-2000s the council moved to the Civic Offices on Wilmer Road. Birr Municipal District meetings will continue to be held there though it will not have the same powers as the Town Council.

Birr Court House
Birr Court House, built c1830, is a detached five-bay two-storey castellated courthouse located on Townsend St, Birr. Over the years the building has served as a prison, court and county council offices. The courthouse has since closed down and now lies empty.

Services and amenities
Birr is the principal market town of South Offaly and also serves parts of northeast Tipperary. The main street has a number of shops.

The town is served by three primary schools (St Brendan's Boys school, Mercy Primary School and the Model Primary School) and one secondary school (St. Brendan's Community School). 

The newspaper The Midland Tribune, covering South Offaly and North Tipperary, has its office in the town.

Sport

Hurling

Birr's hurling team, Birr GAA, has won the All-Ireland championship four times. Several of Birr's hurlers, including Brian Whelahan, attended St. Brendan's Community School.

The first ever All-Ireland hurling final was played in Hoare's field (currently the location of a Tesco store) in Birr on Easter Sunday, 1 April 1888, between Tipperary and Galway. The match was won by Tipperary on a score line of 1 goal, 1 point and 1 forfeit point to Galway's no score. A forfeit point was given against a player carrying the sliotar over his own goal line. The remarkably low score, albeit under different rules to the modern game, is recorded as the lowest score ever in a hurling match in the Guinness Book of Records.

Rugby

Founded in 1887, Birr RFC is one of the oldest rugby football clubs in Ireland. The club has lapsed on several occasions, particularly during the two world wars and again in the mid-1950s. It was reformed in 1963 and has been in continuous existence since.

Golf
Birr Golf Club is an 18-hole golf course which was founded in 1893. The club claims to be one of the oldest in Ireland. The course was founded originally at Barrone Court, moving to its present location at the Glenns, north of Birr, in 1909.

Events and festivals

The annual Birr Vintage Week and Arts Festival takes place in the town in August. The festival is run over one week, and includes a vintage parade, markets, and music and theatre events. Birr is also home to Birr Festival of Music, OFFline Film Festival, Scripts Ireland's Playwriting Festival and Hullabaloo! Offaly's Childrens Arts Festival. The Irish Game and Country Fair also takes place in August, at Birr Castle, and includes a number of educational and entertainment activities. The Irish Hot Air Balloon Festival also takes place in the grounds at Birr Castle, in September.

Birr Theatre and Arts Centre, located in the Oxmantown Mall, is a local cultural and social amenity for the arts, dance, film, music and theatre. The theatre has a 220 seating capacity. The building dates from January 1889 and is a Victorian period style structure within the surrounds of the tree lined Oxmantown Mall. Musicians and performers to have played at the theatre include Luka Bloom, Mundy, Jack L, Don Baker, Johnny Carroll, Frances Black, Ronnie Drew, Pat Shortt, Ballet Ireland and several local and national theatre groups. Birr Stage Guild also stage plays in the theatre.

People

 Luka Bloom, singer, wrote most of his 1998 album 'Salty Heaven' while resident in the town and described Birr as having the best trees in Ireland in the album's liner notes
 Eamon Bulfin, Irish republican activist during the 1916 Easter Rising, raised the Irish Tricolour over the GPO during the rising
 William Bulfin, early 20th-century author
 John Caffrey, recipient of the Victoria Cross
 Joseph Stirling Coyne (1803–1868), playwright, journalist, and one of the first editors of Punch magazine
 Olwyn Enright, former Fine Gael TD for Laois–Offaly
 Tom Enright, former Fine Gael TD for Laois–Offaly
 Barry Glendenning, journalist
 Des Keogh, actor, born in Birr in 1935
 Mundy, musician
 John Murray, recipient of the Victoria Cross
 Bernadette O'Farrell actress best known for playing Maid Marian in the 1950s TV version of The Adventures of Robin Hood
 William Parsons, 3rd Earl of Rosse, astronomer
 William Parsons, 7th Earl of Rosse, businessman and current owner of Birr Castle
 Johnny Pilkington, hurler
 Aidan Quinn, actor
 Roesy, musician
 George Johnstone Stoney, physicist
 Mary Helena Synge, composer
 Mary Ward, first person to die in a car accident, 1869
 Brian Whelahan, hurler, 2009 Fine Gael candidate for Offaly County Council

Climate
Climate in this area has mild differences between highs and lows, and there is adequate rainfall year-round. The Köppen climate classification subtype for this climate is "Cfb" (Marine West Coast Climate/Oceanic climate).

See also
 List of towns and villages in Ireland
Market Houses in Ireland

References

External links

Birr Castle Demesne
Birr Theatre & Arts Centre
Birr Leisure Centre
The Birr Scientific and Heritage Foundation (link 1)
The Birr Scientific and Heritage Foundation (link 2)
Birr Town Council

 
Towns and villages in County Offaly
Planned communities in the Republic of Ireland
Parishes of the Roman Catholic Diocese of Killaloe